Alumu is a Plateau language spoken by approximately 7,000 people in Nassarawa State, Nigeria. It has lost the nominal affix system characteristic of the Niger–Congo family.

Dialects
Two varieties, Alumu and Tesu, differ only in intonation. Information for Alumu and Tesu is listed from Blench (2004).

Alumu (or Arum), with 4,000 speakers, is spoken in the settlements of Arum-Kado (main settlement), Arum-Tsabo, Arum-Sarki, Arum-Tumara, Arum-Chugbu, Arum-Kurmi (Gbira), and Arum-Chine.

Tesu (Təsu) (Hausa: Chessu), with just under 2,000 speakers, is spoken in the two villages of Chessu Sarki and Chessu Madaki, which are about one kilometre apart from each other on the Wamba - Fadan Karshi road.

Akpondu is also closely related (also Babur, Nisam and Nigbo) but moribund or extinct, and its classification as a separate language or as a shifting dialect or sociological group of related dialects is not clear.

Phonology

It is unclear whether or not vowel nasality is phonemic in Alumu.

References

Languages of Nigeria
Alumic languages